A serenade, in its most general sense, is a musical composition and/or performance intended to honour an individual. It may also refer to:

Books
 Serenade (novel), a 1937 novel by James M. Cain
 Serenade (poetry collection), a 1930 anthology by J. Slauerhoff
Serenade, a 2011 novel by Zülfü Livaneli

Film 
 The Serenade (film), a 1916 American film featuring Oliver Hardy
 Serenade (1921 film), a First National Pictures film
 Serenade (1927 film), an American film starring Adolphe Menjou
 Serenade (1937 film), a German film directed by Willi Forst
 Serenade (1940 film), a French film starring Lilian Harvey
 Serenade (1956 film), an American film starring Mario Lanza, based on the novel of the same name by James M. Cain

Music 
 Serenade Chamber Orchestra, an Armenian orchestra founded in 1991
 We Are Serenades, a.k.a. Serenades, a Swedish pop duo

Classical
 Serenades (Brahms), two of the earliest efforts by Johannes Brahms to write orchestral music
 Sérénade, by Charles Gounod
 Serenade (Stravinsky), a composition for solo piano completed by Igor Stravinsky in 1925
 Serenade (Bruch), a 1900 composition for violin and orchestra by Max Bruch
 The Serenade, an 1897 Broadway operetta with music and lyrics by Victor Herbert and book by Harry B. Smith

Albums
 Serenade (Neil Diamond album) (1974)
 Serenade (Katherine Jenkins album) (2006)
 Serenades (album), 1993 debut album by the British rock band Anathema
 Serenade, a 1994 BZN album

Songs
 "Serenade" (song from The Student Prince), a song from the operetta The Student Prince and the 1954 film of the same name, where it was sung by Mario Lanza
 "Serenade" (song from Serenade), a song from the 1956 film Serenade, sung by Mario Lanza
 "Serenade", a 1976 song from the album Fly Like an Eagle by the Steve Miller Band
 "Serenade", a 1983 song from the album Steeler by Steeler
 "Serenade" (Dover song), 1997
 "Serenade" (Shades song) (1997)
 "Serenade" (Tackey & Tsubasa song) (2004)

Other uses 
 MV Serenade, a French ocean liner and later cruise ship
 Serenade (ballet), a 1934 ballet by George Balanchine
 Serenade (TV series), a 1959 Australian TV series
 Serenade, a character in the video game Eternal Sonata
 Serenade (Hong Kong), a private housing estate in Tai Hang, Causeway Bay, Hong Kong

See also 
 Serenata (disambiguation)